The 1978 British motorcycle Grand Prix was the tenth round of the 1978 Grand Prix motorcycle racing season. It took place on 5–6 August 1978 at Silverstone Circuit.

500cc race report
Kenny Roberts and Barry Sheene, the two championship contenders arrived in England for the British Grand Prix with only three points separating them. The race ended in controversy when torrential rains during the race, along with pit stops for tire changes by both Roberts and Sheene, created confusion among official scorers. Eventually, Roberts was declared the winner with Sheene being awarded third place behind privateer Steve Manship, who did not stop for a tire change.

500cc classification

350 cc classification

250 cc classification

125 cc classification

Sidecar classification

References

British motorcycle Grand Prix
British
Motorcycle Grand Prix
August 1978 sports events in the United Kingdom